Adam Ollas-Mattsson (born July 30, 1996) is a Swedish professional ice hockey defenseman. He is currently playing with the Malmö Redhawks in the Swedish Hockey League (SHL).

Playing career
Ollas Mattsson played youth hockey with Djurgårdens IF and made his senior debut during the 2013–14 season in the Allsvenskan. Ollas Mattsson was selected by the Calgary Flames in the sixth round (175th overall) of the 2014 NHL Entry Draft.

At the conclusion of 2016–17 season, his third season within the Swedish Hockey League (SHL) with Djurgårdens IF, Ollas Mattsson pursued his ambition for a NHL contract in agreeing to an amateur try-out contract to close out the year with the Stockton Heat of the American Hockey League, the primary affiliate of draft club, the Calgary Flames, on March 21, 2017.

Ollas Mattsson played two full seasons with the Stockton Heat, appearing in a career high 65 games for 6 goals and 18 points in the 2018–19 season. Unable to garner an NHL contract from the Flames, Ollas Mattsson opted to return to the SHL in Sweden as a free agent, signing a two-year contract with the Malmö Redhawks on 28 May 2019.

Career statistics

Regular season and playoffs

International

References

External links

1996 births
Living people
Calgary Flames draft picks
Djurgårdens IF Hockey players
Malmö Redhawks players
Stockton Heat players
Swedish ice hockey defencemen
Ice hockey people from Stockholm